The eggNOG database is a database of biological information hosted by the EMBL. It is based on the original idea of COGs (clusters of orthologous groups) and expands that idea to non-supervised orthologous groups constructed from  numerous organisms. The database was created in 2007 and updated to version 4.5 in 2015. eggNOG stands for evolutionary genealogy of genes: Non-supervised Orthologous Groups.

References

External links
 http://eggnogdb.embl.de

Biological databases
Evolutionary biology
Phylogenetics